Sculptured is an American experimental and progressive metal band, mixing melodic and atonal segments.

Biography
Following the dissolution of his previous band, guitarist Don Anderson began Sculptured as mostly a one-man project in 1996.  With the help of John Schlegel (drums) and Brian Yager (clean vocals), Sculptured recorded their first and only demo Fulfillment in Tragedy (1996).  The demo secured them a deal with Poland's Mad Lion Records for their debut album The Spear of the Lily is Aureoled (1998).  The debut was eventually licensed to the brand new The End Records for North America and was the 4th release by the record label.  The debut combined the demo recordings with  four new songs that were recorded at the same studio (Soundtracks) with the same engineer (Ronn Chick).

During this same time the band recorded a cover of Iron Maiden's "Iron Maiden" for an Iron Maiden tribute album that also doubled as an American metal complication titled Maiden America: Iron Maiden Tribute (Twilight Records, 1998).  The band's version of the song featured a doomy and slower intro with nylon string guitars, and a jazz/swing middle part featuring trumpet.

Now completely signed worldwide to The End Records, Sculptured completed their sophomore recording Apollo Ends (2000).  This album expanded the use of brass instruments started with the debut and placed a greater emphasis on atonality and dissonance.  The core lineup for Apollo Ends was Don Anderson (guitars, vocals), Brian Yager (clean vocals), Jason Walton (bass), and John Haughm (drums).  This was also the core lineup for John Haughm's main project at the time, Agalloch (minus Yager).  During this period the trio simultaneously rehearsed and recorded both Agalloch's Pale Folklore (1999) and Sculptured's Apollo Ends.

In 2001 the band (Anderson, Yager, and Haughm) recorded a cover of Goblin's main theme from the film Suspiria for a Goblin tribute album that was never released.  This cover was released on The End Records' sampler Phases: the Dark Side of Music (2002).

Sculptured would not record their third album until 2008.  The lineup changed once again with the addition of Dave Murray (drums), Andy Winter (keyboards), Tom Walling (vocals), and returning bassist Jason Walton.  Embodiment (2008) was composed predominantly with atonal and serialist techniques using what Anderson called 4-tone row matrices.

From 2008 to 2021 Sculptured was dormant as Anderson focused his time and energy on Agalloch who were quickly growing in popularity and touring regularly. However, Anderson mentions that he "had ideas going since 2010." Following Agalloch's breakup in 2016, Anderson quickly completed what would become 2021's The Liminal Phase.  However, the three members of Agalloch: Anderson, Walton, and Aesop desired to continue as a working band and began working with Aaron Gregory of Giant Squid on a new project called Khôrada.  This project was signed to Prophecy Productions and released one album, 2018's Salt and played a handful of shows before disbanding.  Now, with only Sculptured as his main project, Anderson completed the recording for The Liminal Phase which was released on August 27, 2021, by BMG.  The lineup features returning longtime bassist Jason Walton and keyboardist Andy Winter, drummer Martti Hill (Barrowlands), and vocalist Marius Sjoli.

Discography

Full-length albums
The Spear of the Lily is Aureoled (1998)
Apollo Ends (2000)
Embodiment (2008)
The Liminal Phase (2021)

Compilations
Until the End of Time: An End Records Compilation (1998)
Maiden America: Iron Maiden Tribute (1998)
White: Nightmares in the End: An End Records Compilation (1999)
Phases: the Dark Side of Music: An End Records Compilation (2002)

Personnel

Current members

Don Anderson - guitar, vocals
Marius Sjoli - vocals
Jason Walton - bass guitar
Martti Hill - drums
Andy Winter - keyboards

Past members
Burke Harris - trumpet
John Haughm - drums  (Agalloch)
Clint Idsinga - trombone
Chris Maycock - drums
John Schlegel - drums
Brian Yager - vocals
Tom Walling - vocals
Dave Murray - drums

References

External links
Facebook site

Heavy metal musical groups from Washington (state)
American avant-garde metal musical groups
Musical groups established in 1996